Jan Kavan (26 May 1905 – 7 June 1986) was a Czech sculptor. His work was part of the sculpture event in the art competition at the 1932 Summer Olympics.

References

1905 births
1986 deaths
20th-century Czech sculptors
20th-century male artists
Czech male sculptors
Olympic competitors in art competitions
Artists from Prague